Anna-Maria Sieklucka (born 31 May 1992) is a Polish actress. She is known for her leading role in the erotic drama film 365 Days (2020).

Early life 
Sieklucka was born in Lublin, the largest city in eastern Poland. Her father, Jerzy Antoni Sieklucki, is a lawyer. She studied at the Wrocław-based Faculty of Puppetry of AST National Academy of Theatre Arts and graduated in 2018. She is able to speak fluent Polish, English, French and German.

Career 

In October 2019, she appeared in one episode of the Polish television series Na dobre i na złe, focused around the life of paramedics and hospital staff.

She made her film debut playing Laura Biel, opposite Michele Morrone, in the erotic drama film 365 Days (2020) and the sequel. She described filming as a challenge, and was initially hesitant to accept the role after reading the script. The movie was met with very negative critical reception but was popular in many countries all over the world, according to Newsweek it was the most-watched Netflix film in 2020. Sieklucka was nominated for a Golden Raspberry Award for Worst Actress for her performance.

Filmography

Film

Television

References

External links

  
 

21st-century Polish actresses
Polish film actresses
Polish television actresses
Living people
Actors from Lublin
1992 births